Survivor: The Australian Outback (also referred to as Survivor: Australia) is the second season of the American reality television series Survivor. Broadcast by CBS, it was originally shown between January 28 and May 23, 2001. Filming took place at Goshen cattle station, on the bank of the Herbert River in northern Queensland from October 23 through December 3, 2000. The show was hosted by Jeff Probst and featured 16 participants competing over 42 days. It was the first season to have more than 39 days of gameplay.

Tina Wesson was named the Sole Survivor, defeating Colby Donaldson by a jury vote of 4–3 and winning a prize of US$1,000,000. Wesson became the first female winner of the series. The series was generally well received, with many outlets considering it one of the best Survivor series. The opening episode premiered after Super Bowl XXXV to 43.5 million viewers.

Overview

Survivor is a reality television show created by Mark Burnett and Charlie Parsons and based on the Swedish show Expedition Robinson. The series follows a number of participants who are isolated in a remote location, where they must provide food, fire, and shelter for themselves. Every three days, one participant is removed from the series by majority vote, with challenges being held to give a reward (ranging from living and food-related prizes to a car) and immunity from being voted off the show. The last remaining player is awarded a prize of $1,000,000.

Filming of Survivor: The Australian Outback took place from October 23 through December 3, 2000, at Goshen Station, a cattle station on the bank of the Herbert River (approximately 3 hours southwest of Cairns) in northern Queensland. The season premiered after Super Bowl XXXV on January 28, 2001, to 43.5 million viewers.

Contestants
The cast consisted of 16 contestants, who were initially separated into two tribes: Ogakor, named after the word for "crocodile" in the Kunjen language, and Kucha, named after the word for "kangaroo" in the Pakanha language. Midway through the season, the remaining ten players merged into a single "Barramundi" tribe, named after the river fish. The final seven eliminated contestants comprised the jury that decided who would be the winner.

Future appearances
Tina Wesson, Colby Donaldson, Jerri Manthey, Alicia Calaway, and Amber Brkich returned to compete in Survivor: All-Stars. Donaldson and Manthey would again return for Survivor: Heroes vs. Villains. Michael Skupin competed in Survivor: Philippines, while Wesson would appear on Survivor: Blood vs. Water along with her daughter, Katie Collins (who appeared in The Australian Outback as a loved one via video chat). Jeff Varner and Kimmi Kappenberg returned for Survivor: Cambodia, and Varner made his third Survivor appearance in Survivor: Game Changers. Brkich, under her married name Mariano, competed again in Survivor: Winners at War.

Outside Survivor, Elisabeth Filarski, now Hasselbeck, went on to host on the ABC talk show The View and later served as a contributor to Fox News. Brkich also competed on The Amazing Race 7 with her fiancé and fellow Survivor alumnus Rob Mariano; the couple, now married, then returned for The Amazing Race 11. Jeff Varner and Alicia Calaway made an appearance on Big Brother 2. Colby Donaldson hosted Top Shot, which ran on the History Channel for five seasons. He has also hosted other shows such as Top Guns, The Butcher, and Alone.

Season summary
Although Ogakor fared significantly worse in challenges, the tribes were merged with five members apiece after Kucha member Michael Skupin suffered third-degree burns from a campfire and had to be medically evacuated. The first vote after the merge saw a tie, but Kucha member Jeff Varner was eliminated due to previous votes being cast against him. Ogakor's majority alliance of Colby Donaldson, Keith Famie, and Tina Wesson alternated between eliminating former Kucha members and betraying former tribe-mates Jerri Manthey and Amber Brkich. The three stayed together until the end, and Donaldson took Wesson with him into the final Tribal Council. Tina's strategic plan was valued over Colby's prowess in challenges, and she was awarded the title of Sole Survivor by a jury vote of 4–3.

{| class="wikitable nowrap" style="margin:auto; text-align:center"
|-
!colspan="3"|Episode
!colspan="2"| Challenge winner(s)
! colspan="2" |Eliminated
|-
! No.
! Title
! Original air date
! Reward
! Immunity
!Tribe
!Player
|-
!1
|align="left"|"Stranded"
|align="left"|January 28, 2001
|colspan=2 
|
|Debb
|-
!2
|align="left"|"Suspicion"
|align="left"|February 1, 2001
|
|
|
|Kel
|-
!3
|align="left"|"Trust No One"
|align="left"|February 8, 2001
|
|
|
|Maralyn
|-
!4
|align="left"|"The Killing Fields"
|align="left"|February 15, 2001
|
|
|
|Mitchell
|-
!5
|align="left"|"The Gloves Come Off"
|align="left"|February 22, 2001
|
|
|
|Kimmi
|-
!6
|align="left"|"Trial By Fire"
|align="left"|March 1, 2001
|
|
|
|Michael
|-
!7
|align="left"|"The Merge"
|align="left"|March 8, 2001
|{{stribe|None|None}}
|Keith
| rowspan="2" 
|Jeff
|-
!8
|align="left"|"Friends?"
|align="left"|March 14, 2001
|Jerri[Amber]
|Keith
|Alicia
|-
!9
|align="left"|"The First 24 Days"
|align="left"|March 21, 2001
| colspan="4" | Recap Episode|-
!10
|align="left"|"Honeymoon or Not?"
|align="left"|March 29, 2001
|Colby,Jerri
|Nick
| rowspan="6" 
|Jerri
|-
!11
|align="left"|"Let's Make a Deal"
|align="left"|April 5, 2001
|
|Colby
|Nick
|-
!12
|align="left"|"No Longer Just a Game"
|align="left"|April 12, 2001
|Colby
|Colby
|Amber
|-
!13
|align="left"|"Enough Is Enough"
|align="left"|April 19, 2001
|Tina
|Colby
|Rodger
|-
!14
|align="left"|"The Final Four"
|align="left"|April 26, 2001
|Colby
|Colby
|Elisabeth
|-
!15
|align="left"|"The Most Deserving"
| rowspan="2" style="text-align:left;" |May 3, 2001
|
|Colby
|Keith
|-
! 16
| style="text-align:left;" |"The Reunion"
| colspan="4" style="background:darkgrey;" |
|}In the case of multiple tribes or castaways who win reward or immunity, they are listed in order of finish, or alphabetically where it was a team effort; where one castaway won and invited others, the invitees are in brackets.Episodes

Voting history

Notes

 Reception 
The series was well received by critics. In 2013, both Andrea Reiher of Zap2it and Joe Reid of The Wire ranked The Australian Outback as the third greatest season of the series. Ken Tucker, writing for Entertainment Weekly, gave the series a B+ grade, praising the evolution of the strategy used, but was less receptive to the editing used on the series. Since 2012, the Survivor site "Survivor Oz" has consistently ranked The Australian Outback highly in its annual polls ranking every season of the series; it was third in 2012, fourth in 2013 and 2015, and sixth in 2014. In the official issue of CBS Watch commemorating the 15th anniversary of Survivor in 2015, The Australian Outback was voted by viewers as the fourth greatest season in the series. In another poll for the same magazine, Skupin's injury in the fire was voted as the ninth most memorable moment in the series. In 2015, a poll by Rob Has a Podcast ranked Australia 10th out of 30, although host Rob Cesternino ranked the season 22nd. This was updated in 2021 during Cesternino's podcast, Survivor All-Time Top 40 Rankings, ranking 20th out of 40. In 2020, this season was also ranked 17th out of 40 by "The Purple Rock Podcast", citing the good cast. Later in the year, Inside Survivor ranked this season 15th out of 40, praising the cast and iconic moments but acknowledging that the season declined after the merge of the two teams. Conversely, Dalton Ross of Entertainment Weekly called this season overrated, ranking it 24th out of 40. Host Jeff Probst ranked it as the 8th-best season, citing such memorable contestants as "Colby, the prototype for a Survivor 'hero'; Jerri, the original 'black widow'; and Elisabeth 'The View' Filarski," as well as Michael Skupin's injury. In 2021, Kristen Kranz of Collider also ranked The Australian Outback as the 8th best season of the series and praised it for having "no shortage of great players" as well as its introduction to, "some truly interesting characters to the Survivor'' world."

Controversy 
During a reward trip, contestant Colby Donaldson broke an Australian law by breaking off coral from the Great Barrier Reef which could have resulted in a fine of 110,000. The helicopter pilot involved in the reward trip also broke an Australian law as he flew over sea bird rookeries. Producer Mark Burnett apologized on behalf of Donaldson and the production team after the season had aired.

References

External links
 

Nielsen ratings winners
02
Super Bowl lead-out shows
2001 American television seasons
2000 in Australian television
Television shows set in Queensland
2001 in Australian television
Television shows set in the Outback
Television shows filmed in Australia